Cycling at the 2017 Commonwealth Youth Games is held on streets of New Providence, Bahamas.Time trial took place on 19 July while road race took place on 23 July 2017.

Results

Men's

Women's

References

External links
Results

2017 Commonwealth Youth Games events
2017 in road cycling